The Cockburn Association (Edinburgh's Civic Trust) is one of the world's oldest architectural conservation and urban planning monitoring organisations, founded in 1875.

The Scottish judge Henry Cockburn (1779–1854) was a prominent campaigner to protect and enhance the beauty of Edinburgh, notably resisting construction of new buildings on the south side of Princes Street. The association was founded in 1875 to continue the legacy of his work.

Since 1991, the organisation has been responsible for Edinburgh's annual Doors Open Day scheme.

The first major campaign by the association was to resist the removal of trees at Bruntsfield Links and the association has campaigned for the retention and improvement of Edinburgh's open and green spaces ever since. The association successfully resisted plans to build an inner city motorway system in Edinburgh in 1965.

See also
Civic Trust (England and Wales)
National Trust for Scotland
Scottish Civic Trust
Architectural Heritage Society of Scotland

References

External links
Official website

Charities based in Edinburgh
Interested parties in planning in Scotland
1875 establishments in Scotland
Heritage conservation in Scotland
Organizations established in 1875
Architectural conservation
Heritage organisations in Scotland
Architecture in Scotland